Velykomykhailivka is a Ukrainian village in the Synelnykove Raion of Dnipropetrovsk Oblast. It is located on the right bank of the Vovcha River.

Etymology
Velykomykhailivka is named after the name of the first Zimchan Cossack. Since there were two villages named Mikhailivka, the larger one became known as Velykomykhailivka, and the smaller one became Malayamykhailivka. Local people also called the town Dibrivka, after the oak forests that surrounded it.

History
The burial mounds located to the south and north of Velykomykhailivka testify to the settlement of this area during the Bronze Age.
During the time of the New Sich (1734-1776) the village was used as winter quarters by the Zaporozhian Cossacks. In 1776, the governor of Azov, replaced them with the state military settlement of Mykhailivka. In 1779, it had 175 households.
Before the abolition of serfdom in 1861, Velykomykhailivka had 652 households, 3,828 inhabitants, a school, and two markets.
In 1913, Velykomykhailivka had 1059 households, 5 schools, a medical and veterinary hospital, a post office, a brick and tile factory, three steam mills, two steam oil mills, a warehouse for agricultural implements and a telephone exchange.

In 1918, Velykomykhailivka was the site of the Battle of Dibrivka, during which the insurgent forces led by Nestor Makhno and Fedir Shchus defeated the Austro-Hungarian Army in battle;
After the establishment of the Ukrainian Soviet Socialist Republic, Velykomykhailivka was blacklisted by the Bolsheviks. As a result, the village suffered from famines in 1921 and in 1932, reducing the population by a half.
During the Great Patriotic War, Velykomykhailivka was liberated by units of 1164th and 1168th rifle regiments. The Nazis attempted to keep the village. On the night of 13-14 September 1943, artillery and tanks were brought up to the village. The battle began on the morning of 14 September and lasted about three hours. When the Nazi invaders retreated, they left behind their dead, weapons, equipment, ammunition.

Famous people
 - Teacher, local historian, museologist and historian of the Makhnovist movement;
Kilina Lopatka - Hero of Socialist Labour;
Petro Petrenko - Commander in the Revolutionary Insurgent Army of Ukraine;
Fedir Shchus - Cavalry commander in the Revolutionary Insurgent Army of Ukraine;
 - Hero of the Soviet Union, three times awarded the Order of Lenin, three times the Order of the Red Banner;
 - writer, professor of physical, mathematical and economic sciences;
 - linguist, professor of Philosophical Sciences;
Dmytro Zaytsiv - entomologist.

References

1776 establishments in the Russian Empire
Populated places established in the Russian Empire
Villages in Synelnykove Raion